Antonín Dvořák wrote his String Quartet No. 10 in E major, Op. 51 (B. 92), in 1879 at the request of Jean Becker, the leader of the Florentine Quartet.  It is sometimes nicknamed the Slavonic Quartet (Becker had asked specifically for a "Slavonic Quartet" in the wake of Dvořák's "Slavonic Dances" and "Slavonic Rhapsodies"). The quartet was dedicated to Jean Becker; it was first performed by the Joachim Quartet at a private chamber music evening on July 29, 1879, in Berlin. It was published by Simrock, Berlin, in 1879.

Structure

It is composed of four movements:

The Slavonic character of the Quartet derives from the scherzo movement which has the form of a Dumka, and from the last movement, which according to Šourek is 'an art stylization of the very characteristic Czech "skočna".'

A typical performance lasts about 32 minutes.

References

Notes

Sources

External links

Performance of String Quartet no. 10 by the Borromeo String Quartet from the Isabella Stewart Gardner Museum in MP3 format

Dvorak 10
1879 compositions
Compositions in E-flat major